The United States Air Force's 817th Expeditionary Air Support Operations Squadron (817 EASOS) is a combat support unit located at an undisclosed location in the Middle East. The 817 EASOS provides Tactical Command and Control of air power assets to the Joint Forces Air Component Commander and Joint Forces Land Component Commander for combat operations.

Lineage
The lineage of the 817th Air Support Operations Squadron from inception to 2009:
 Constituted as 817th Air Support Operations Squadron on 27 May 1994
Activated on 1 July 1994
Inactivated on 30 September 1996
 Redesignated 817th Expeditionary Air Support Operations Squadron, and converted to provisional status, on 12 February 2009

Assignments
The assignments of the 817th Air Support Operations Squadron from inception to 2009:
 617th Air Support Operations Group, 1 July 1994
 Third Air Force, 1 August-30 Sep 1996
 Air Combat Command to activate or inactivate at any time on or after 12 February 2009

Stations
The stations of the 817th Air Support Operations Squadron from inception to 2009:
 Wurzburg, Germany, 1 July 1994 – 30 September 1996

Decorations
 Air Force Outstanding Unit Award: [1 July 1994]-31 August 1995

References

External links 
 Emblem at The Institute of Heraldry

Air support operations squadrons of the United States Air Force